Navvāb is a district in the south-west of the central district of Tehran, Iran.

Further reading

 

Neighbourhoods in Tehran